Panionios Water Polo Club is the water polo team of Panionios multi sport club. It has got teams both men and women. The men's team of Panionios is playing in A1 Ethniki (first division) and the women's team is also playing in A1 Ethniki Women (first division).

Men's team
Panionios had had a water polo team by the period it was based in Smyrna, before 1922. It kept up the team when it moved in Athens but some time later it was dissolved.
The water polo team of Panionios was refounded again in 1985, after the building of natatorium in Nea Smirni.
In the ’90s, the water polo men section gradually comes back to top levels and participates in the top division A1 Ethniki for several years (1993-1994, 1995-1996, 1997-1998, 1998-1999). However, poor economics cause the section to relegate again to B division. In season 1994-95, Panionios won the championship of A2 Ethniki (second division) and got promoted to A1 Ethniki (first division).
Since 2005, Panionios stars in the championship, finishing in the first places every year.  Soonly it had successes in European competitions. It played two times in the final of the LEN Euro Cup (2009 and 2011) but was defeated. Panionios had played five times in the final of the Greek cup but has been defeated in all matches.

Recent seasons

Honours
A1 Ethniki 
Runners-up (2):2009, 2010
Greek Water Polo Cup
Runners-up (5): 2006, 2008, 2009, 2010, 2011
  LEN Euro Cup
Runners-up (2):2009, 2011

Current roster
2020–21
Players:
 Konstantinos Limarakis
 Matthaios Salteris
 Aristos Anagnostou
 Gregory Kapetanakis
 John spiropoulos
 Dimitrios Bouzalas
 Kostas Koukounas
 George Kalaitzis
 Dimitris Dimou
 Sean Spooner
 Dionysis Braimi
 Spyros Gavalas
 Jason Dalapas
 Dimitris Mosxovelis
 Christos helmis
 George Pournaras
 Nikos Karakasis
 Ahmed Barakat
 Kimon Alexiou
 Dimokritos Zouridis

Coach:
 Kostas Dimou

Women's team
The women team of Panionios was founded in 1988. In season 1993-94 played in first division (A1 Ethniki) but it relegated. It played again in first division from season 2009–10 to 2011–12. In the last season (2012–13) played in A2 Ethniki and finished in second place.

Recent seasons

References

External links

Official website
Αφιέρωμα υδατοσφαίρισης ανδρών Α1: Πανιώνιος Hellenic Swimming Federation, Official Page 

Water polo clubs in Greece
Water Polo
Nea Smyrni